Trepocarpus is a genus of flowering plants belonging to the family Apiaceae.

Its native range is Central and Southeastern USA.

Species:
 Trepocarpus aethusae Nutt. ex DC.

References

Apioideae
Apioideae genera